Hydraotes Chaos is a broken-up region in the Oxia Palus quadrangle of Mars, located at 0.8° North and 35.4° West. It is 417.5 km across and was named after a classical albedo feature name. More information and more examples of chaos regions can be found at Martian chaos terrain. The area contains small conical edifices, called Hydraotes Colles, which were interpreted as the Martian equivalent of terrestrial cinder cones formed by volcanic activity.

See also 

 Chaos terrain
 Geology of Mars
 HiRISE
 List of areas of chaos terrain on Mars
 Martian chaos terrain

References

External links 

Oxia Palus quadrangle
Chaotic terrains on Mars